Christopher Leonidas Olsen (born 25 September 1981) is a retired Norwegian footballer.

He was born in Colombia, but was adopted to Harstad in Norway at the age of three. In 1996, he made his debut for Harstad. He was picked up by Tromsø in 2002, and played in the Norwegian Premier League. However, he had cruciate ligament injury problems. He played for Tromsdalen from 2005 to 2007, and joined Hønefoss in 2008.

He made his debut for Hønefoss on 13 April 2008, and has (per 1 January 2010) played 53 matches, of which 3 were cup matches. Ahead of the 2013 season he joined local minnows Jevnaker.

After a lengthy spell in Jevnaker, he rejoined Hønefoss as playing coach for their reserve team. He also played two cup games for Hønefoss' A team.

Career statistics

References

1981 births
Living people
People from Harstad
Colombian emigrants to Norway
Harstad IL players
Norwegian footballers
Expatriate footballers in Colombia
Tromsø IL players
Tromsdalen UIL players
Hønefoss BK players
Jevnaker IF players
Eliteserien players
Norwegian First Division players
Association football midfielders